BB Good may refer to:
 B. B. Good, American disc jockey
 "BB Good" (song)